The Liberty Building is a historic building located in downtown Des Moines, Iowa, United States. It has been a downtown landmark since 1923. The Liberty Building is located at the SW corner of 6th Avenue and Grand Avenue in the heart of downtown Des Moines. The building was originally home to Bankers Life Insurance & WHO (AM) Radio.

The building consists of retail, office and residential spaces. In 2008, Nelson Construction and K.C. Holdings completely rehabilitated the building. Shiffler Associates Architects designed the remodel.  There is office space available on floors 4,5, and 6, and storefront space on the 1st floor. The building currently houses a gym and fitness center on the 1st and 2nd floor and a bank on the second and third floors.  It is connected to the Des Moines Skywalk system.

Currently, the Liberty building is housing Hyatt Place Hotel, designed by Slingshot Architecture, as well as condos on several floors. First Hospitality Group and Baker Group own the building.  It was listed on the National Register of Historic Places in 2010.

References

External links

Commercial buildings completed in 1923
Skyscrapers in Des Moines, Iowa
Office buildings on the National Register of Historic Places in Iowa
National Register of Historic Places in Des Moines, Iowa
Skyscraper hotels in Iowa
Residential skyscrapers in Des Moines, Iowa
Commercial architecture in Iowa
Chicago school architecture in Iowa
1923 establishments in Iowa